Robert Schindel (born 4 April 1944) is an Austrian lyricist, director and author.

Life and career 
Robert Schindel was born on 4 April 1944 in Bad Hall, Upper Austria to Jewish communist parents.

From 1950 to 1954, he attended elementary school and then the Bundesrealgymnasium in Vienna. In 1959, Robert Schindel left the Gymnasium; he was "entlassen wegen schlechter Führung" ("dismissed because of poor leadership") and began an apprenticeship as a bookseller at Globus-Verlag in Vienna, which he broke off. This was followed by trips to Paris and Sweden, where he made his way as a dishwasher among other things.

According to his own statement, he was a member of the Communist Party of Austria from 1961 to 1967.

In 1967, Schindel caught up with his Matura, studied philosophy and law for two semesters and was involved in Maoist circles. However, he described Café Hawelka as his real university, where he met H. C. Artmann and Oskar Werner among others.

He became one of the founders of the student movement "Kommune Wien", based on the Berlin model, and the literary magazine Hundsblume, in which he also published his lyrical texts. Other artists who became famous later, such as Elfriede Jelinek and the twin couple Konstantin Kaiser and Leander Kaiser, also belonged to his circle. In 1970 Schindel published the novel Kassandra.

Robert Schindel is a member of the Freie Akademie der Künste in Hamburg and the Deutsche Akademie für Sprache und Dichtung. He founded the first state literary institution in Austria to promote creative writing and has been teaching there as a university lecturer at the Institute for Linguistic Art at the University of Applied Arts Vienna since 2009.

Awards 

 1989: Förderpreis des Kulturkreises im Bundesverband der Deutschen Industrie
 1991: Elias-Canetti-Stipendium der Stadt Wien
 1992: Österreichischer Förderungspreis für Literatur
 1992: Förderpreis des Marburger Literaturpreises
 1992: Dr. Emil-Domberger-Literaturpreis der B'nai B'rith Européen
 1993: Erich Fried Prize
 1995/1996: Stadtschreiber von Klagenfurt
 1997: DAAD-Stipendium in Berlin
 2000: Mörike-Preis der Stadt Fellbach
 2003: Literaturpreis der Stadt Wien
 2005: Willy und Helga Verkauf-Verlon Preis des DÖW für österreichische antifaschistische Publizistik
 2005: Silbernes Ehrenzeichen für Verdienste um das Land Wien
 2007: Jakob-Wassermann-Literaturpreis der Stadt Fürth
 2009: Kulturpreis des Landes Oberösterreich für Literatur
 2010: Poetik-Professur an der Universität Bamberg
 2013: Johann-Beer-Literaturpreis für Der Kalte
 2014: Heinrich-Mann-Preis

Works 

 Ohneland. Gedichte vom Holz der Paradeiserbäume. 1979–1984. Suhrkamp, Frankfurt am Main 1986, .
 Geier sind pünktliche Tiere. Gedichte. Suhrkamp, Frankfurt am Main 1987, .
 Im Herzen die Krätze. Gedichte. Suhrkamp, Frankfurt am Main 1988, .
 Ein Feuerchen im Hintennach. Gedichte 1986–1991. Suhrkamp, Frankfurt am Main 1992, .
 Gebürtig. Roman. Suhrkamp, Frankfurt am Main 1992, .
 Die Nacht der Harlekine. Erzählungen. Suhrkamp, Frankfurt am Main 1994, .
 Gott schütz uns vor den guten Menschen. Jüdisches Gedächtnis – Auskunftsbüro der Angst. Suhrkamp, Frankfurt am Main 1995, .
 Immernie. Gedichte vom Moos der Neunzigerhöhlen. Suhrkamp, Frankfurt am Main 2000, .
 Nervös der Meridian. Gedichte. Suhrkamp, Frankfurt am Main 2003, .
 Zwischen dir und mir wächst tief das Paradies. Liebesgedichte. Vorwort von André Heller; Illustrationen von Christof Subik. Insel Verlag, Frankfurt am Main/ Leipzig 2003 (Insel-Bücherei 1227), .
 Fremd bei mir selbst. Gedichte. Nachwort Marcel Reich-Ranicki. Suhrkamp, Frankfurt am Main 2004 
  Kassandra. Roman. Vorwort von Robert Menasse. Haymon, Innsbruck 1979/2004, 
 Wundwurzel. Gedichte. Suhrkamp, Frankfurt am Main 2005 
 Der Krieg der Wörter gegen die Kehlkopfschreie, Capriccios. Haymon, 2008, 
 Mein mausklickendes Saeculum. Gedichte. Suhrkamp, Frankfurt am Main 2008, 
 Dunkelstein. Eine Realfarce. Haymon, Innsbruck 2010, 
 Man ist viel zu früh jung. Essays und Reden. Jüdischer Verlag im Suhrkamp Verlag, 2011, 
 Der Kalte. Roman. Suhrkamp, Berlin 2013, 
 Don Juan wird sechzig. Heiteres Drama. Hollitzer, Wien 2015, 
 Scharlachnatter. Gedichte. Suhrkamp, Berlin 2015, 

 In anthology
 Aurélie Maurin, Thomas Wohlfahrt Hgg.: VERSschmuggel. InVERSible. Canadian poetry – Poésie du Quebec. (in German, English and French) Wunderhorn, Heidelberg 2008 . With 2 CDs

Theatre 
 Dunkelstein, eine Realfarce (2008) – Premiere March 2016, Theater Nestroyhof Hamakom

Literature 
 Martin A. Hainz: "Todesfuge – Todesorgel". Zu Paul Celan und Robert Schindel. In: Zeitschrift für deutsche Philologie. Band 124 (2005), p. 227–242.
 Béatrice Gonzalés-Vangell: Kaddisch et Renaissance. La Shoah dans les romans viennois (1991–2001) de Robert Schindel, Robert Menasse et Doron Rabinovici. Septentrion, Valenciennes 2005, .
 Matthias Beilein: 86 und die Folgen. Robert Schindel, Robert Menasse und Doron Rabinovici im literarischen Feld Österreichs. Erich Schmidt, Berlin 2008, .
 Iris Hermann: Bei Robert Schindel in Wien zu Tisch. Rindfleisch und Knödel, Rotwein und Mokka. In: Claudia Lillge, Anne-Rose Meyer (publisher): Interkulturelle Mahlzeiten. Kulinarische Begegnungen und Kommunikation in der Literatur. Transcript, Bielefeld 2008, p. 105–123.
 Iris Hermann: Möchte ich ein schwimmender Schreiber sein. Von der "Wortsucht" in Robert Schindels Gedichtband "Wundwurzel". In: Zeitschrift für deutsche Philologie. Band 127 (2008), p. 269–284.
 Iris Hermann, Meinolf Schumacher: Da bin ich und das wars. "Strichpunktexistenz" und "Flüsterdennoch": Robert Schindels Gedicht "Amfortas" (2007). In: Sprachkunst. Band 39/1 (2008), p. 59–75 (PDF).
 Andrea Kunne: "Verschwinden. Zwischen den Wörtern". Sprache als Heimat im Werk Robert Schindels. Studien-Verlag, Innsbruck/ Wien/ Bozen 2009, .
 Iris Hermann (publisher): Fährmann sein. Robert Schindels Poetik des Übersetzen. Wallstein, Göttingen 2012, .

External links

Literature from and about Robert Schindel in the German National Library
Official website

References 

1944 births
Living people
Austrian male writers
Jewish socialists
Jewish Austrian writers